Chorrera postica is a species of snout moth in the genus Chorrera. It was described by Philipp Christoph Zeller in 1881 and is found in Colombia.

References

Moths described in 1881
Phycitinae